The 2013 Richmond Spiders football team represented the University of Richmond in the 2013 NCAA Division I FCS football season. They were led by second-year head coach Danny Rocco and played their home games at E. Claiborne Robins Stadium. The Spiders played as a member of the Colonial Athletic Association. They finished the season 6–6, 4–4 in CAA play to finish in a three way tie for fifth place.

Schedule

Source: Schedule

Ranking movements

References

Richmond
Richmond Spiders football seasons
Richmond Spiders football